The Arcola Presbyterian Church is a historic Presbyterian church in Arcola, Louisiana, United States. It was built in 1859 and is of the Greek Revival architectural style. It is owned by the Amite–Arcola Presbyterian Church in Amite, Louisiana. The five-acre property was dedicated in 1859 by John Corkern and John Leonard to promote "Christianity, morality and education under the jurisdiction of the Conference of the Methodist Episcopal Church South."

By 1861 the church was practicing as Presbyterian. In 1897 it became an official Presbyterian church. On June 3, 1964, the property was given to the congregation.

The Arcola church was listed on the National Register of Historic Places in 1982.

References

Churches on the National Register of Historic Places in Louisiana
Churches in Tangipahoa Parish, Louisiana
Churches completed in 1859
Greek Revival church buildings in Louisiana
Presbyterian churches in Louisiana
Southern Methodist churches in the United States
National Register of Historic Places in Tangipahoa Parish, Louisiana
1859 establishments in Louisiana